The Beginning of the End was a funk group from Nassau, Bahamas. The group formed in 1969 and consisted of three brothers (Frank, Raphael "Ray", and Roy Munnings), a fourth member on bass (Fred Henfield), and a fifth on guitar (Livingston Colebrook). They were complemented by the Funky Nassau Horns.

They released an album entitled Funky Nassau in 1971 on Alston Records (a subsidiary of Atlantic Records), and the track "Funky Nassau" became a hit single in the U.S., peaking at #15 on the Billboard Hot 100 chart, and #7 on the Billboard R&B chart. The same track reached #31 in the UK Singles Chart in March 1974.

Members
Raphael "Ray" Munnings - organ
Roy Munnings - guitar
Frank Munnings - drums
Fred Henfield - bass
Livingston Colebrook - guitar

Discography

Albums

Singles

References

Atlantic Records artists
Bahamian musical groups